Pilar Campoy  (born 6 October 1990) is an Argentine field hockey player and part of the Argentina national team.

She was part of the Argentine team at the 2014–15 Women's FIH Hockey World League where she won a gold medal, and at the 2016 Summer Olympics in Rio de Janeiro. On club level she played for Club Náutico Hacoaj in Argentina.

References

External links
 
 
 

1990 births
Living people
Las Leonas players
Olympic field hockey players of Argentina
Argentine female field hockey players
Field hockey players at the 2016 Summer Olympics
Expatriate field hockey players
Argentine expatriate sportspeople in Spain
South American Games gold medalists for Argentina
South American Games medalists in field hockey
Competitors at the 2018 South American Games
Club de Campo Villa de Madrid players
People from Vicente López Partido
Sportspeople from Buenos Aires Province